The Mianus River Gorge is a  nature preserve in Bedford, New York jointly owned by The Nature Conservancy and Mianus River Gorge, Inc.. The first  were purchased by the Preserve, with help from the Conservancy, their first land preservation deal.  It has grown over the years and is still managed by Mianus River Gorge, Inc.  In March 1964, it was designated a National Natural Landmark for its old growth climax hemlock forest and the gorge of the Mianus River.

History
In 1954, Gloria and Anthony Anable reached out for help from The Nature Conservancy which pledged $7,500 to help purchase  of land in the gorge, its first land preservation purchase.

In 1990,  were donated as part of a development deal.

In 2007, The Nature Conservancy purchased  of adjacent wetlands to protect the gorge and its watershed.

Geology
The gorge is a periglacial formation, carved by streams as the glacier retreated.  It contains several types of bedrock including Bedford Augen Gneiss (an igneous intrusion from the Late Devonian period), Hartland Schist, Precambrian and Cambrian gneiss and quartzite.  Cameron's Line passes through the preserve.

The old Hobby Hill pegmatite quarry is located in the northern section of the preserve.  The Havenmeyer Falls is also part of the preserve.

Wildlife and vegetation
In 2003, the Preserve began to manage its deer population via limited bow hunting.  They did so to decrease the risk of excessive deer populations causing damage to the vegetation.  They believed that very small scale reductions could effectively manage the population without adversely affecting neighboring populations due to the rose petal hypothesis of deer populations.
 
There are numerous species of trees, shrubs, vines, herbs, and ferns within the preserve.

Access
The preserve is open from April 1 to November 30, 8:30 a.m. to 5 p.m.

See also

 List of National Natural Landmarks in New York
 Mianus River Gorge
Mianus River

References

External links
Mianus River Gorge, Inc.
The Nature Conservancy: Mianus River Gorge Preserve
Trail map

National Natural Landmarks in New York (state)
Nature Conservancy preserves in New York (state)
Protected areas of Westchester County, New York
Nature reserves in New York (state)